Fantastica Mania 2013 is the name of three professional wrestling major shows that took place on January 18, 19 and 20, 2013 in Korakuen Hall in Tokyo, Japan. The event was the third ever co-promoted events between Japanese New Japan Pro-Wrestling (NJPW) and the Mexican Consejo Mundial de Lucha Libre (CMLL) and featured matches with wrestlers from both promotions. 2013 was the first year that Fantastica Mania included three dates, compared to only two previously. The events featured title defenses of both CMLL and NJPW championships.

Background

The events featured six or seven professional wrestling matches on each event with different wrestlers involved in pre-existing scripted feuds or storylines. Wrestlers portray either villains (referred to as heels in general or rudos in Mexico) or fan favorites (Faces or técnicos in Mexico) as they compete in wrestling matches with pre-determined outcomes.

Consejo Mundial de Lucha Libre (CMLL) wrestler Titán was the first man announced for the show, as he earned his spot by winning the En Busca de un Ídolo ("In search of an idol") tournament. Rey Bucanero was originally announced as part of the shows, but on December 19, 2012, New Japan announced that he had been sidelined with a knee injury and would be replaced by Rey Escorpión on the shows. On January 15, 2013, New Japan announced that Místico II would be unable to wrestle at the events due to a dislocated shoulder, but would still attend to sign autographs. His spot in the matches would be filled by Atlantis. The matches were not rearranged due to the substitution but instead simply had Atlantis substitute Mistico without considering ongoing CMLL storylines.

Results

January 18

January 19

January 20

Torneo cibernetico elimination order

See also
2013 in professional wrestling

References

2013 in Tokyo
2013 in professional wrestling
2013
January 2013 events in Japan
Professional wrestling in Tokyo